Kombiverkehr is an intermodal transport business based in Frankfurt, Germany. It is an intermodal operator in Europe, operating a fleet of block trains linking 30 countries. In May 2010, Kombiverkehr launched a service between Antwerp and Duisburg; services to Turkey have also been launched.

Kombiverkehr is a member of the UIRR.

References

External links
Kombiverkehr

Companies based in Frankfurt
Transport in Europe
Intermodal transport
UIRR